The men's 100 metres event at the 1977 Summer Universiade was held at the Vasil Levski National Stadium in Sofia on 19 and 20 August.

Medalists

Results

Heats
Held on 19 August

Wind:Heat 1: -0.1 m/s, Heat 3: +1.0 m/s, Heat 4: -1.4 m/s, Heat 7: -0.6 m/s

Semifinals
Held on 20 August

Wind:Heat 1: ? m/s, Heat 2: ? m/s, Heat 3: +0.6 m/s

Final
Held on 20 August

Wind: +0.2 m/s

References

Athletics at the 1977 Summer Universiade
1977